Erhardt v. Boaro can refer to:
 Erhardt v. Boaro, 113 U.S. 527 (1885)
 Erhardt v. Boaro, 113 U.S. 537 (1885)